The  New Orleans VooDoo season was the seventh season for the franchise in the Arena Football League. The team was coached by Pat O'Hara and played their first three home games at the New Orleans Arena. Due to the renovations to the arena that started immediately following the conclusion of the New Orleans Hornets season, the Voodoo played their remaining six home games at the Mercedes-Benz Superdome. The VooDoo had a chance to clinch a playoff berth in their final game, but lost to finish the season with a 5–13 record.

Roster

Standings

Regular season schedule
The VooDoo began the season by hosting the Orlando Predators on March 24. They closed the regular season against the Predators in Orlando on July 27.

References

New Orleans VooDoo
New Orleans VooDoo seasons
New Orleans VooDoo